Boney is an Australian television series produced by Fauna Productions during 1971 and 1972, featuring James Laurenson in the title role of Detective Inspector Napoleon Bonaparte. Two series, each of thirteen episodes, were filmed.

The series is centred on Bonaparte, an Australian Aboriginal character, created by Arthur Upfield, who wrote twenty-nine Bony novels between 1929 and 1964.

Cast
 James Laurenson as Detective Inspector Bonaparte (Boney) (Series 1 and 2).
 Nick Tate as Sgt Peter Irwin (two episodes in Series 1).
 Kate Fitzpatrick as Constable Alice McGorr (Series 2 only).

Notable guest stars
 Deryck Barnes as Sgt Colin Harvey (ep "Boney Walks With Death").
 Honor Blackman as Mary Answorth (ep "Boney In Venom House").
 Ken Goodlet as Inspector Walters (ep "Boney And The Kelly Gang").
 David Gulpilil as various characters in various episodes, both series - plus featured dancer in opening and closing sequences.
 Max Phipps as Morris Answorth (ep "Boney In Venom House").
 Jack Thompson as Red Kelly (ep "Boney And The Kelly Gang").
 Charles "Bud" Tingwell as Jeff Stanton (ep "Boney And The Powder Trail").
 Bindi Williams as Pintubi (ep "Boney And The Powder Trail").
 Googie Withers as Mrs Loftus (ep "Boney And The Reaper"), Diana Thompson (ep "Boney Hunts A Murderess"), also in ep "Boney And The Paroo Bikeman".

Production
Australian TV audiences were introduced to Detective Inspector Napoleon Bonaparte in 1972. "Boney" (spelled "Bony" in the books) was an Aboriginal detective who tracked murderers by spotting an overturned twig or a crushed ant on the sand. A loner who never failed to crack a case, he was impatient with authority, charming, arrogant and an expert burglar, moving in a world of sunbaked claypans and the most distant reaches of the Outback where only the Aborigines could survive.

Arthur Upfield's books told of a baby found in the bush near the body of his Aboriginal mother (killed for her forbidden relationship with a white man). He was taken to a mission station where he was given the name Napoleon Bonaparte and grew up to be a detective specializing in murder cases.

Development  
During 1963, British film director Michael Powell first visited Australia to preproduce his film, They're A Weird Mob. There he met actor and theatre businessman John McCallum and Bob Austin (a legal expert) who used their local knowledge to find finance from Australian backers. The film did well, and three years later the trio bought the film and television rights to the Bony detective novels. A script written for Paramount Pictures failed to secure a deal, and Powell moved on to other projects.

By 1970, John McCallum, Bob Austin and veteran Australian producer Lee Robinson had set up Fauna Productions, and having made their reputation with the children's TV series Skippy the Bush Kangaroo and Barrier Reef and the feature film Nickel Queen, they found finance to make a series titled Bonaparte from various international sources (American investors had shown enthusiasm, but had pulled out when their demand that Bony be completely white was refused).

It was decided to shoot the stories in contemporary Australia, and English playwright and scriptwriter Eric Paice flew over to head the writing team. Signed up to direct alternate episodes were experienced drama helmers Peter Maxwell and Eric Fullilove, and casting for Upfield's unusual half-Aboriginal hero began.

Casting
According to John McCallum: "We looked all over Australia! Ideally, of course, the part should have been played by a half-Aborigine, and we saw hundreds of people, but it needed someone with very considerable acting experience and expertise. We auditioned white actors in every state, but there was no-one with the right physiognomy and characteristics for the part..."

Aboriginal groups feared that black actors were being discriminated against, and publicly denounced Fauna.

An English actor, Jon Finch, was eventually signed, but when he pulled out two weeks before shooting began, McCallum had to fly to London. Having interviewed more than eighty actors, and just about to phone home and postpone production, an actor from New Zealand, James Laurenson, arrived, and McCallum knew he'd found Bony, although Laurenson would have to wear dark make-up for the part.

Well known Aboriginal actor Jack Charles recounted in 2010 how, when he auditioned for the role in 1972, the producer told him they were looking for an actor with blue eyes.

Laurenson's casting was immediately criticised. He said in a 1972 interview: "I think any actor, black or white or yellow, has the right to play any part... I can understand their grievances but the company searched long and hard for an aboriginal Boney. They felt they couldn't come up with anyone who could sustain a six days a week schedule. You do need a certain amount of experience to stay alive".

Bob Maza said "I could have guaranteed John McCallum ten articulate, sophisticated black people to play that part. He didn't look very hard. Did he look at all?"

Upfield had told McCallum that he'd always intended to call his detective "Boney", but a printer's error had changed it to "Bony" - and the preferred spelling replaced "Bonaparte" as the title of the series. The crew flew to Alice Springs during July 1971 to film the first episode, "Boney Buys A Woman". Twelve-hour six-day working weeks bonded the producers, cast and crew. As John McCallum recalled: "It wasn't an easy series to shoot. The long lines of communication to Sydney added to our difficulties and costs. Rushes took days, sometimes weeks to get to us. The heat was appalling for most of the time and the flies worse. But we had a splendid crew who would work in the blazing sun or the pouring rain... they complained, of course, but they did it!".

The first series was well received in Australia and internationally, so a further thirteen episodes were filmed, co-starring Kate Fitzpatrick as Boney's assistant, Constable Alice McGorr. The second season started filming in July 1972.

Reception
In contrast to the greater popularity that Upfield's character Bony had in the United States compared to Australia, the series was not shown in America. According to John McCallum, several attempts to sell the series to distributors in the United States were rejected as they could not accept that a police detective, along with most of the criminals he hunted, did not use firearms. Although there was interest in producing a third series, it was James Laurenson's reluctance over typecasting issues that eventually prevented it.

While some episodes are set in towns, the unique atmosphere of "Boney" lies in its use of the Outback - the best stories take place in scorched orange landscapes where the white person is an outsider, and Boney needs all his inherited skills to solve the crime. Wonderful images abound: a white-haired Aboriginal chief touring his lands in a rusty car pulled by camels; a car pushed into the path of a train by a combine harvester; a ghostly Aborigine revenge squad implacably hunting a murderer - and spearing him.

Australian Aboriginal people are represented as dignified characters in the series - low-key, reserved, but dangerous when angered, operating on the edges of the white world, but sometimes willing to help Boney, often using telepathy or magic.

James Laurenson’s Boney is magnetic, arrogant yet charming, exasperatingly self-confident and determined not to take "No" for an answer (unless it's the answer he wants). John McCallum said that "James gave an excellent performance. He looked right and he sounded right, and I think Arthur Upfield would have been very pleased with him".

Reviewing Boney and the Black Opal The Age said Laurenson's "talent is wrapped in a tall frame and dark, rugged good looks that should make him Australia's newest TV sex symbol".

Valda Marshall of the Sydney Morning Herald said Laurenson was "superb... I predict Laurenson will have half the women of Australia drooling over their sets. He turns in an extraordinary performance, with not even a drop of Maori blood, he looks completely the part of the half-caste Aboriginal detective".

1990s series
In 1992, a series entitled Bony was shown in Australia. Its thirteen episodes were produced by Grundy, a company known for packaging quiz show formats and producing soap operas. Starring 26-year-old actor and singer Cameron Daddo, the Bony pilot film was about Inspector Bonaparte’s grandson David, himself a detective - but (reacting to complaints from Aboriginal viewers) in the resulting series Daddo’s character was a white policeman who had been brought up by Aboriginals, and who had an elderly black mentor, his uncle (played by Burnum Burnum). Partly funded by the West German broadcaster ZDF, which had put money into the 1971/2 series, the producers had bought the name Bony, but the series bore no other relation to the Upfield books nor the Fauna series.

In popular culture
Record producer Frank Farian named the 1970s disco group Boney M after the character.

References

External links
 
 Boney Episode Guide
 Boney The Original TV Series One & Two
 Boney - a song by Rolf Harris about the character

1972 Australian television series debuts
1973 Australian television series endings
1970s Australian crime television series
1970s Australian drama television series
Television shows based on Australian novels
Indigenous Australian television series